Smael Simon Mondon Jr. is an American football linebacker for the Georgia Buldogs.

High school career
Mondon Jr. attended Paulding County High School in Dallas, Georgia. A five-star recruit, he played in the 2021 All-American Bowl. He committed to the University of Georgia to play college football.

College career
As a true freshman at Georgia in 2021, Mondon Jr. played in all 15 games as a backup recording 10 tackles and one sack. He took over as a starter his sophomore year in 2022.

References

External links
Georgia Bulldogs bio

Living people
Year of birth missing (living people)
Players of American football from Georgia (U.S. state)
American football linebackers
Georgia Bulldogs football players